Warja Lavater (28 September 1913 – 3 May 2007) was born in Winterthur, Switzerland. She was a Swiss artist and illustrator noted primarily for working in the artist's books genre by creating accordion fold books that re-tell classic fairy tales with symbols rather than words (or even pictures).

Personal life 

Lavater spent the first nine years of her life in Moscow and Athens. In 1922, her mother (the author Mary Lavater-Sloman) and father (Emil Lavater, an engineer) settled the family back in Winterthur. After attending High School, Lavater studied graphic arts in Zurich from 1931 to 1935 at the Fachklasse für Grafik an der Kunstgewerbeschule Grafik (School of Applied Arts). It was here, in 1932, she began studying under Ernst Keller in a class of 28 of which 7 were women. Later in life, Lavater recalled this training:What we were learning was design, and so we began with the most important thing, drawing. Where do you put a sign in a rectangle? What is the standard solution to this exercise? Should the strongest element be the sign or the drawing? How can both be distinguished at a distance, yet integrated in a composition? 

Studying in Stockholm, Basel, and Paris, she opened her own studio for applied design in Zurich in 1937 with Gottfried Honegger, her future husband. It was here that Lavater embarked on her first profession as a designer of symbols, logos, and trademarks. Among her initial creations were the three keys logo of the Schweizerischen Bankverein (Swiss Bank Corporation- which is now used by its successor, Swiss global financial services company UBS AG) and the logo for the Swiss National Exhibition of 1939.

After marrying Honegger in 1940, she bore two daughters: Bettina (1943) and Cornelia (1944).

From 1944 to 1958 she worked extensively with the young person's magazine Jeunesse designing the covers, supplying illustrations, and being responsible for typography.

Moving to New York City in 1958, she began designing scientific illustrations for Dell Publishing Visual series. It was during this early period in New York that Honegger-Lavater became influenced by  American street advertising and began to utilize pictograms as graphic representations of linguistic elements in her work. In 1962, the New York City Museum of Modern Art published her William Tell as a single sheet lithograph, accordion  folded in the "Leporello" style, with a legend listing the meanings of the various symbols (e.g., a single blue dot represents William Tell). The story proceeds chronologically as the book unfolds, and is told entirely by using the symbols without words. She produced a growing number of similar works throughout the rest of her career.

By 1995 she was creating videos of colors and symbols moving across a screen, set to music.

At the time of her death she was retired and residing outside of Zurich. She is interred at the Fluntern Cemetery in Zürich.

Her artistic estate is held by the Zürich Central Library.

Honegger-Lavater was a direct descendant of the Swiss poet and physiognomist Johann Kaspar Lavater.

Early work in artists' books 

Lavater's William Tell and Edward Ruscha's book Twentysix Gasoline Stations were both published in 1962 (though in later editions Ruscha's copyright is given as 1963). Ruscha's book has been cited by some as the first modern artist's book, though there were actually several other artists working with the book form at the same time.  This claim can now be contested noting that Lavater's work, as well as that of another Swiss-German artist, Dieter Roth, preceded Ruscha.

Starting in 1963, the Paris-based publisher Adrien Maeght began publication of a series of her folding books broadly entitled Imageries. These books consist of classic fairy tales from the Brothers Grimm, Charles Perrault, and Hans Christian Andersen. These were also done as accordion folded books with stories told using symbols rather than written language.

Educational influence 

Lavater's work has been used by educators in the areas of artistic development and literacy. The National Library of France has encouraged children to explore artistic expression using the techniques created by Lavater. Faculty at the University of Erfurt have produced two pedagogical guides for teaching literacy and creativity to young children using Lavater's version of the classic fairy tale, Snow White (Schneewittchen)  and  the German fairy tale Hans in Luck (Hans im Glück).

Works

Prints 

 2300 years of medical costume : distinctive garb of the medical and related professions from the time of Hippocrates to the Napoleonic era. North Chicago, Ill. : Abbott Laboratories, 1962 (OCLC )
 Chacun sa chimère : sept eaux-fortes; Portfolio with 5 signed dry point etchings combined with color lithography.  Paris : A. Maeght, 1984.  (OCLC )

Books 
{| class="wikitable collapsible collapsed"
! Authored, illustrated, contributed, and edited (50+ items)
|-
|
 Der Fröschlacher Kuckuck; Leben und Taten einer Stadt in zwanzig Abenteuern by Albin Zollinger; illustrated by Warja Honegger-Lavater. Zürich, Atlantis Verlag [©1941]  (OCLC )
 Sandy und die Kinder : ein Bilderbuch, Zurich : JUWO-Verlags A.G, [1949] (OCLC )
 Tyll Ulenspiegel und Lamme Goedzak : Legende von ihren heroischen, lustigen und ruhmreichen Abenteuern im Lande Flandern und andern Orts by Charles de Coster; illustrated by Warja Lavater. Zürich : Adolf Hürlimann, 1951 (OCLC )
 Die Befreiung, eine Novelle by Mary Lavater-Sloman; illustrated by Warja Honegger-Lavater. Zürich : Artemis-Verlag ©1951 (OCLC )
 Voyages et voyageurs by Mary Lavater-Sloman; illustrated by Warja Honegger-Lavater. Beinne, Switz. : General Motors Suisse, ©1952 (OCLC )
 Die Linie by Warja Honegger-Lavater; Marga Bührig, [S.l.] : [s.n.], [1958] 24 sheets + 9 postcards (OCLC )
 Il paziente difficile [s.l.] : [s.n.] [1960?] Geigy Spa s.d., Milano
 Vererbung : Erbgut, Umwelt, Persönlichkeit by Hans Burla and Marco Schnitter; illustrated by Warja Honegger-Lavater.  [München] ; [Zürich] : Droemer-Knaur, [1962] (OCLC )
 Talentophages, [s.l.] : [s.n.], 1962 (OCLC )
 William Tell (Folded Story, No. 1), New York : Junior Council, Museum of Modern Art, 1962 (OCLC )
 Die Grille und die Ameise (Folded Story, No. 2), Basel, Switzerland : Basilius Presse, ©1962 Basel, Switzerland : Basilius Presse, ©1962 (OCLC )
 Match (Folded Story, No. 3), Basel : Basilius Presse, ©1962 (OCLC )
 Die Party (Folded Story, No. 4), Basel : Basilius Presse, ©1962 Basel, Switzerland : Basilius Presse, ©1962 (OCLC)
 La promenade en ville (Folded Story, No. 5), Basel : Basilius Presse, ©1962 (OCLC )
 Raub der Sabinerinnen (Rape of the Sabine Women), (Folded Story No. 6), Basel : Basilius Presse, ©1963 (OCLC ,)
 Passion and Reason (Folded Story No. 7), Basel : Basilius Presse, ©1963 OCLC)
 The Good Intention is Blue (Folded Story, No. 8), Scarsdale, N.Y. : Wittenborn, 1963? )
 Nacht und Tag und Nacht (Folded Story, No. 9), Basel : Basilius Presse, ©1963 OCLC )
 Extra—ordinary Lemuel (Folded Story No. 10), Basel : Basilius Presse, ©1963 OCLC )
 Walk, dont walk, attendez, gehe, dont walk, passez, warte, walk, dont (Folded Story No. 11), Basel : Basilius Presse, ©1965 (OCLC ).
 Re, re, Revolution, re (Folded Story No. 12), Basel : Basilius Presse, ©1965 OCLC )
 Sunday Harlem Faith Temple gospel songs : Vorzingen einer Gruppe Handeklatschen Mitzprechers mitzingen Extatisches Himwerfen ohnmacht Tanzen, 1964? (OCLC )
 Homo Sapiens ? (Folded Story, No. 13), Basel, Switzerland : Basilius Presse, ©1965 (OCLC ).
 Lucky Jack (Folded Story, No. 14), Basel, Switzerland : Basilius Presse, ©1965 (OCLC ).
 Das hässliche junge Entlein (The ugly duckling) (Folded Story, No. 15),  Basil : Basilius Presse, 1965 (OCLC ).
 Les présences du peintre Paris : [s.n.], 1965? (OCLC ).
 Die seltsame Spiegelgasse in Zürich (Folded Story, No. 16),  Basil : Basilius Presse, 1966 (OCLC ).
 Conform --ismus, --ity, -- isme (Folded Story, No. 17),  Basil : Basilius Presse, 1966 (OCLC ).
 Ramalalup (Folded Story No. 18), Basil : Basilius Presse, 1967 (OCLC )
 Das Feuer und seine Höhlen (The fire and its caves) (Folded Story No. 19), Basil : Basilius-Presse, 1967 (OCLC )
 L'histoire d'un personnage à la recherche de la personnalité, Basel, Switzerland : Basilius Presse, 1968 (OCLC )
 Le non-obéissant. The disobedient. Der Ungehorsame, Basil : Basilius Presse, 1968 (OCLC )
 Et pourtant, la masse n'existe pas : la peur, l'individualiste : imagerie, Bâle, Suisse Basilius Presse [u.a.] 1968 (OCLC ,)
 Le faible et le fort, Basel, Switzerland : Basilius Presse ; New York : Wittenborn and Co., ©1968.
 Die Fabel vom Zufall, Paris Maeght [u.a.] 1969 
 Imageries, (Perrault, Charles,; 1628–1703) Paris : A. Maeght, 1965-1982 (OCLC )

Retelling of 6 fairy tales by Charles Perrault in coded images and colors. Each volume is an accordion-fold, printed on one side, individually encased in lucite, all volumes in box slipcase.

(v. 1). Le Petit Poucet -- (v. 2). Blanche Neige -- (v. 3). Le Petit Chaperon Rouge -- (v. 4). La fable du Hasard -- (v. 5). La Belle au Bois dormant -- (v. 6). Cendrillon.

Also published individually:

 Le Petit Poucet, Paris : A. Maeght, 1979 (OCLC )
 Blanche Neige, Paris : A. Maeght, 1974 (OCLC )
 Le Petit Chaperon Rouge, Paris : A. Maeght, 1965 (OCLC )
 La fable du Hasard, Paris : A. Maeght, 1968 (OCLC )
 La Belle au Bois dormant, Paris : A. Maeght, 1982 (OCLC ))
 Cendrillon, Paris : A. Maeght, 1976 (OCLC )

 Peau de lion : souvenirs , [S.l.] : [s.n.], 1970 (OCLC )
 Die wilde Betty by Johann Karl Wezel illustrated by Warja Honegger-Lavater. Zürich : Adolf Hürlimann, [1970] (OCLC )
 The Melody of Turdidi: an Imagery, New York : J. Halioua, ©1971 (OCLC )
 Les illusions : une imagerie dessinée sur pierre, Locarno : Lafranca, 1972. (OCLC )
 Les gens drogués : une imagerie dessinée sur pierre, Locarno : Lafranca, 1972.
 Lune enchantée : une imagerie, racontée et dessinée d'après le conte de Charles Perrault "La belle au bois dormant", Paris : Adrien Maeght, 1973 (OCLC ,)
 Perzeptionen: es spricht, die sicht im, Sicht, Gedicht, Zürich : Adolf Hürlimann, 1973 (OCLC )
  : moving ... for our very little ones, New York : the Museum of Modern Art, 1976 (OCLC )
 Die Rose und der Laubfrosch: eine Fabel (The Rose and the Tree frog: a Fable), Zurich : Edition Schlegl, 1978 (OCLC )
 Die Leute : ein Punktogramm, Bern : Benteli ©1979 
 Leporello, Paris : [W. Lavater?], ©1982 (OCLC ,)
 Bâton rond et bouffon nommé virgule, Paris Zürich : Müller, ©1982, (OCLC )
 Roman, Amsterdam : Da Costa, 1985, (OCLC )
 Hirten : eine Geschichte in Reimen : [begleitet von weissen und schwarzen Merkmalen Juli 1984 bis März 1985], Zürich : ok Eichholzer, 1985, (OCLC )
 Un anagram : plénitude? [Non] - solitude? [Non], Zürich : Atelier Handsatz Fässler, Paris : [s.n.] 1987 (OCLC )
 Ergo : un pictogram sur les conséquences de "Je pense donc je suis", Paris : Adrien Maeght, ©1988 (OCLC )
 Fraternité - égalité - liberté. chaque jour ... un pictogram., O.O. u. Vlg. 1988 (12 numbered copies)
 Le souverain et son bouffon : "pictogramm mural" ; lithographie., Paris : Les Amis du Musée d'Art Moderne de la Ville de Paris, 1988 (OCLC )
 La mauvaise herbe : "pictogramm mural" ; lithographie., Paris : Les Amis du Musée d'Art Moderne de la Ville de Paris, 1988 (OCLC ,)
 Johann Caspar Lavater : suffering, bearing, resting, acting, enjoying = leiden, tragen, ruhen, wirken, geniessen, Zurich : W. Lavater, ©1991 (OCLC )
 Perception - when signs start to communicate : pictogram, Zurich : Truninger-Druck, 1991 (Variations on 5 symbols, written by Johann Caspar Lavater in his last year, "Suffering - Leiden, Bearing - Tragen, Resting - Ruhen, Acting - Wirken, Enjoying - Geniessen", with text by Warja Lavater in English and German. Published on the occasion of the opening of the Interdisciplinary Conference "The Faces of Physiognomy", Dartmouth College, Hanover, New Hampshire, to the 250th birthday of J.C. Lavater. From the collection of Warja Lavater, signed by the artist.) (OCLC )
 Spectacle: un conte, Paris : A. Maeght, 1990 (OCLC )
 Ourasima, Paris : Adrien Maeght 1991 (OCLC ,)
 Tanabata, Paris : A. Maeght, 1994 (OCLC )
 Kaguyahime : une imagerie en transparence d'après le conte japonais, Paris : A. Maeght, 1997 (OCLC )
 Europa : Sérigraphie, Zurich : Galerie Brigitte Weiss, 1999 (OCLC )
 Pictograms, Zurich : Nieves, 2008 (OCLC )
 Le Petit Chaperon Rouge (Braille), France : Talant, 2008 (OCLC )
|}

 Videos 

 Les Imageries, 6 digital animation films, Paris : IRCAM, 1995
Design : Warja Lavater based on the work of Charles Perrault
Graphics Production : Mac Guff Ligne
Composer : Pierre Charvet

 Music 

 Liedli für Mutter und Kind für eine Singstimme und Klavier (co-composed with Gustav Kugler), Zollikon-Zürich :; Sämann-Verlag, 1944 (OCLC )

 Awards 
 Imagina 1995 (held by Institut National de l'Audiovisuel) awards for Les Imageries (video 1995)
 Pixel-INA award in the Art category
 European award of Media Invest Club
 "meilleure bande son" (best sound track)
 Nominee. Hans Christian Andersen Medal (Illustration) 1992

 Exhibitions 

References

 Sources 
 Biography (French Language)
 
 Biography (German Language) via Galerie Brigitte Weiss
 Beckett, Sandra L. "Artists' books for a cross-audience - Warja Lavater" IN Studies in children's literature, 1500-2000, Dublin ; Portland, OR : Four Courts, 2004, pp. 163–166
 Carmin, Jim. "Warja Honegger-Lavater exhibition (Multnomah County Library)" IN  BOOK_ARTS@LISTERV.SYR.EDU, Portland, OR, May 12, 2001
 Kushner, Robert. "Review of Exhibitions - Warja Lavater at the Swiss Institute" IN Art in America vol. 85, no. 4 (April 1997), p. 122
 Lavater, Warja. "Perception: When Signs Start to Communicate" IN The Faces of physiognomy : interdisciplinary approaches to Johann Caspar Lavater. Edited by Ellis Shookman. Columbia, SC : Camden House, 1993. pp. 182–187.
 Mallarte-Feldman, Claire. "Folk Materials, Re-Visions, and Narrative Images: The Intertextual Games They Play" IN Children's Literature Association Quarterly Volume 28, Number 4, Winter 2003. p. 215. E- Print 
 Moholy, Lucia. "Current and Forthcoming Exhibitions - Switzerland" IN Burlington Magazine vol. 105, no. 719 (February 1963), p. 85
 IRCAM (search for single term: Lavater)
 Plath, Monika and Richter, Karen. Die Bildwelten der Warja Lavater "Schneewittchen" : Modelle und Materialien für den Literaturunterricht''. Baltmannsweiler : Schneider-Verl. Hohengehren, 2006. )

External links

 Lithographic works at Maeght Editions (Paris)
 Snow White (1998)
 Création graphique à la manière de Warja Lavater (Graphic creation in the style of Warja Lavater)
 Broward County Digital Collections: Blanche Neige, Cendrillon, Guillame Tell, Kaguyahima
 Obituary (German Language) from Zürcher Tagesanzeiger, May 5, 2007

1913 births
2007 deaths
People from Winterthur
Swiss illustrators
Swiss women illustrators
Swiss children's book illustrators
20th-century Swiss women artists
21st-century Swiss women artists
Burials at Fluntern Cemetery